Susan Elizabeth Duncan (born 1951) is an Australian author, a former journalist and former editor of The Australian Women's Weekly and New Idea.

Personal life
After being diagnosed with breast cancer in 1999, Duncan had a mastectomy and chemotherapy. A cancer survivor, she is an active supporter of breast cancer awareness.

She has been married twice. Her first husband died from a brain tumour. Duncan lives in New South Wales with her current husband, Bob. They have homes at Pittwater and the mid-north coast of NSW. The Pittwater home, on Lovett Bay, is called Tarrangaua and was built for poet Dorothea Mackellar in 1925.

Bibliography

References

External links
Audio interview with Susan Duncan on ABC radio
 Audio interview with Susan Duncan, Conversations, ABC Radio National 01 Nov 2016] 

1951 births
Living people
People from Albury, New South Wales
Place of birth missing (living people)
Australian autobiographers
Australian magazine editors
Women autobiographers
21st-century Australian women writers
21st-century Australian writers
20th-century Australian women writers
20th-century Australian writers
Women magazine editors
Writers from New South Wales